Timanthes of Cythnus was an ancient Greek painter of the fourth century BC. The most celebrated of his works was a picture representing the sacrifice of Iphigenia, in which he finely depicted the emotions of those who took part in the sacrifice; however, despairing of rendering the grief of Agamemnon, he represented him as veiling his face.

A fresco discovered at Pompeii, and now in the Museum at Naples, has been regarded as a copy or echo of this painting (Wolfgang Helbig, Wandgemälde Campaniens, No. 1304).

References

Ancient Greek painters
5th-century BC Greek people
People from Kythnos
4th-century BC painters